The Malaysian Higher School Certificate, commonly abbreviated as STPM, is a pre-university examination in Malaysia. It was formerly known as the Higher School Certificate (HSC). Since 1982, STPM has been administered by the Malaysian Examinations Council (MEC), a statutory council under the Ministry of Education.

STPM is one of the major pre-university systems for admissions to Malaysian public universities, besides the Malaysian Matriculation Programme and the Malaysian Higher Islamic Religious Certificate (STAM). STPM is internationally recognised by many universities, and the results are considered as equivalent to GCE Advanced Level results.

From year 2012 onwards, the modular system has replaced the previous terminal system. The examination series is divided into three semesters and assessed thoroughly, instead of holding one major examination at the end of the examination series in the previous system. Besides that, examination results are monitored by a representative from Cambridge Assessment to maintain standards and quality.

Form Six 

As the national education in Malaysia is modelled after the educational system in England, the pre-university programme is the sixth form of secondary education, referred to as "Form Six". The Ministry of Education selects secondary schools it considers capable of providing Form Six classes. STPM examinations are held throughout Form Six.

Students in Form Six are called sixth formers. Sixth formers in national secondary schools are usually distinct from other students in the lower forms, such as wearing different school uniforms, usually given higher posts within societies of the school, often with lax enforcement of certain school rules and regulations, sometimes even holding a separate morning assembly and recess for sixth formers, also separate co-curriculum activities.

Sixth formers in most schools generally form their own association, officially called the Pre-University Student Representatives Council (formerly known as Form Six Association or the Form Six Society). The main annual activity of these councils is the initiation of new sixth formers during orientation.

Examination system 

STPM is an open-list examination, that means any combination of subjects may be taken. However, most schools and colleges stream their students into science and humanities streams. To be qualified for Malaysian public university admissions, candidates must take General Studies (Pengajian Am) and at least three other subjects.

Most STPM candidates sit for four or five subjects. Majority candidates sit for four subjects, while some candidates sit for five subjects. It is possible for private candidates to sit for less than four subjects, but the results are only recognised by local private and overseas universities.

All STEM-related subjects (Mathematics (M), Mathematics (T), ICT, Physics, Chemistry and Biology) are offered bilingually in English and Malay. All the other subjects, besides language subjects, are offered only in Malay.

School-based assessments (SBA) are implemented for most subjects (except Chinese Language, Literature in English and Tamil Language), making up the weighting of 20% to 40% of overall marks for each subject.

Candidates are allowed to resit for Term 1 and Term 2 examinations for individual subjects if they are unsatisfied with the results. The repeat examinations are usually held around Term 3 examination.

Subjects 

Up to 2014, Further Mathematics was provided as a subject in STPM. However, it was removed since then.

In 2020, Quran Studies (Tahfiz Al-Quran) was introduced as a new subject.

A list of subjects available in STPM are:

General Studies

Language and Literature

Social Sciences and Religion

Science and Mathematics

Arts and health

Grading system 
STPM grading system uses cumulative grade point average (CGPA) system. There are 11 grades in STPM, which are A, A-, B+, B, B-, C+, C, C-, D+, D and F, with F as the failing grade. GPA ranging between 4.00 and 0.00 is assigned to the grades, with A being 4.00, D being 1.00, and F being 0.00.

Grade C and above is considered principal pass, while grade between C- and D is considered partial pass. Grade F is considered fail.

After the term or repeat exam, the paper grades for the term or repeated term will be released shortly afterwards. The grades for school-based assessments, if available, are released with Term 3 results.

Overall results are released shortly after the release of Repeat 1, Repeat 2 and Term 3 results. In the overall results, each subject is graded based on the weighted average marks of all papers in the subject. If a candidate has repeated a paper, then the highest mark between the original and the repeat paper will be taken.

The CGPA for the overall results is calculated by taking the average of GPA of four best performed subjects, including General Studies.

Admissions to Malaysian public universities require CGPA of at least 2.00 and above, with principal passes in three subjects including General Studies. On the other hand, local private universities accept students with only two principal passes without considering the requirement of CGPA.

See also 
 Education in Malaysia
 Malaysian University English Test
 Advanced Level (UK)

References

External links 
 Malaysian Examinations Council (Malay & English language)

School qualifications
School examinations
Standardized tests
Education in Malaysia